is Japanese voice actress and singer Maaya Uchida's 2nd single, released on October 22, 2014. The titular song from the single was used as the opening theme for the anime Gonna be the Twin-Tail!!.

Track listings

Charts

Event 
 『 Maaya Party！Vol.2』　Maaya Uchida 2nd Single Release Event「Maaya Party！Vol.2」（November 1, 2014 - November 8, 2014：Tokyo, Aichi, Osaka）

Album

References

2014 singles
2014 songs
J-pop songs
Japanese-language songs
Pony Canyon singles
Anime songs